Sheikhan City is situated in District Chiniot in Punjab province of Pakistan.

Geography

Southern side
The village Sheikhan is situated some distance  from the right bank of the river Chenab (Chanhan) in the Utar region which flows in the southeast of the village. A rain pond is also located a half-mile from the village on the southern side, called Sangar.

Northern side
On the north side, a canal flowing from the river Jehlum (Vehat) provides water to village lands for cultivation. Most of the population lives in old villages, while a colony was also settled by prime minister Zulfiqar Ali Bhutto in the 1970s for non-landowners. A number of the population also lives on the north side crossing the canal after the development of a link road between Jhang and Lalian, which is called Adda Sheikhan.

Adjoining villages
Bhawana is just  from Sheikhan. Adjoining villages to the west are Ratta Matta, Sahdipur, Tibbi Lalera, TindianWala, Kot Sultan, Inayatpur and Thatta Shah Jamal whole across the river Thatta Muhammad Shah. Several other hamlets (wells) are part of the village and are also populated places like Chah Rustlliwala, Mundi ber, and Jhalar Nathu Shah. As before the canal irrigation system, each  of land was cultivated with the help of wells, so there are several wells on village lands like Gulabewala, Rariwala, Ameerwala, Hari Singh Wala, Kohluwala, etc. On the eastern side Muhammad Wala is located near thana Muhammad Wala.

Vegetation 

Being an agricultural area, most of the land is ploughed but wasteland can still be found here, especially near the riverbanks. Different kinds of trees, grasses and shrubs are found here.

Trees
Kikar, talhi, jand, pippal, bohar, vann.

Shrubs
Karil, akk, etc.

Grasses
Lunak, dhaman, etc.

Herbs
Hermal

People
Most of the people here belong to the Bukhari Sadat tribe, descendants of Shah Sheikhan, who was a descendant of Imam Ali Naqi, the ninth Imam of Shi'a Muslims and also eighth in the pedigree tree of Imam Ali ibn Abu Talib. The other leading tribe is Chadhar whose four families from the Wejhwa sub-tribe of Chadhar live here: Ramzan Ke, Zamme Ke, Ghamme Ke and Dargahi Ke. Small numbers of Sial, Khokhar, Bhutta, Dhudhi, and Bilal Hussain Jani also live here.

History
Sheikhan's name first appears in the history for a skirmish between the Chadhars and Mahni Sials around the 18th century. Noora Chadhar, the son of Salaim, who was the brother of Mirza Sahiba fame Tahir Khan Chadhar had battled with Mahnis of Khiwa. This occurred on the occasion of a festival in Sheikhan in the which seventy Siyals and seven Chadhars were killed; the Sultan Shah of Sheikhan supported the Chadhars.

Celebrities

Shaheed Quaid Allama Syed Arif Hussain Al-Hussaini, Allama syed Sajid Ali Naqvi, Allama Muhammad Hussain Najafi (Dhakku), Allama Nazar Hussain tiwana also known as Nazar Qutbi, Allama Nazir Hussain Dhakku, Allama Syed Iftikhar Hussain Naqvi Al-Najafi the principal Jamia Imam Khomeini Mari Indus, Allama Syed Mazhar Kazmi the principal Jamiatul Baeathat of Rajoa Sadat.

Poets and scholars

Khan Ghulam Abid Baloch, pen name Mumtaz ('Blessed'), Ustad Nazar Muhammad Taseer ( A teacher and a poet ), Riaz Hussain Jaffery

Education
There are two government primary schools for boys in the village, one of which has been serving since before the partition. There are two government primary schools for girls, while there are three private secondary co-schools, namely Jinnah Cadet School. Set almost six years before in the year 1998, Science School System and Al-Qamar Science Education System provide state of the art education.

There are students in engineering (naval, nuclear, telecommunication, chemical, environmental science, civil, etc.), space technology, medicine, business, education and in almost every field of the modern age.

Language 
The prevailing language is Punjabi. Urdu is also spoken.

Culture 
The dominating culture of the region is a civilized form of Bari culture, i.e. the culture of Sandal Bar area, though physically this area is not the part of Sandal Bar region. Sandal Bar is some miles away across the river Chenab.

Calendar 
Along with the modern Gregorian calendar, the traditional Bikrami calendar and the Islamic Hijri calendar (in religious matters) are followed here.

Religious events like births and deaths of Masoomen are followed according to the Islamic Hijri calendar, while official events like school exams, etc. are performed according to the Gregorian calendar, but the Bikrami calendar is popular.

Sports 

Cricket
Volleyball
Kabaddi
Gulli-Danda
Many cricket tournaments were played in this region. Almost all youths are interested in cricket and volleyball.

Dress

Men

Men tie a large plain cloth called  around the waist and it goes to the ankles, while wearing a kurta, which covers the upper part of body; usually it goes to the knees.
 is a piece of cloth usually six meters long and one-and-a-half meter wide.
Men wear a turban on their heads.
But while visiting the houses of syeds, men do not wear turbans out of respect due to the syeds''' status of being descendants of Muhammad.

Women
The style is called ; it is worn in such a way that there is no chance of uncovering part of the lower body.
Women wear scarves on their heads.
It is said that some decades ago women used to wear choli on the upper part of body, which is a part of Rajasthani culture.

Shoes
The traditional shoes are called khussa which are made of pure cow leather and are decorated with  golden or silver ornamentation.

 Jewellery 
With the advent of the modern age, the younger generation usually do not wear traditional dress and are used to wearing shalwar (loose trousers), qameez (a long loose shirt) and English trousers and shirt.

 Food 
Meals are eaten thrice a day.Tukkar, phulka or roti are the local names for bread. Bread is mostly baked in Desi ovens called tandoor. In the past it was only baked in tandoors owned by Dayas but this tradition is gradually vanishing; it is being replaced by stove-baked bread.
 or salt is an essential part of flour prepared for bread. Paratha is a kind of bread whose flour is prepared with oil or Desi gheu.

 is the local name for curry. Also called , it is essentially a mixture of red peppers, salt, water, vegetables, ghee, beef or mutton, taken along with chapatis for lunch or dinner.

 is a common name for rice.

Lassi

Lassi is produced from milk. There are two types of lassi:  lassi and  lassi.

, also called , is the milk of cows, buffaloes, goats, sheep and camels, a favourite of the Jatt peoples.

Local cuisine

 Saag
 Tikrey Vraech Panjeeri

 Judicial system 

Parhen
Even today's fastest world, Parhen or Parhea is working well towards the solution/decision of all social issues generated among the people.

Thana Barana
Located at Muhammad Wala, is the nearest ultimate FIR destiny.

 Religion 
Almost 75% of the population are Shi'a Ithna Ashri Muslims, who believe in 12 imams with Hujjat Ibn al Hassan al Askari, the final imam, appearing at the end times.
All the people became followers of Shi'ism when Chaghatta, belonging to the Zamme Ke family of the Wejhwa Chadhar tribe, started preaching Shi'ism almost 150 years before. The other 25% Sunni Muslims have a peaceful coexistence.

 Holy places 
There are four mosques and Imam Bargahs in different points of the villages, of which two are the oldest ones. One of which is cared for by the syeds of the village, while the other is cared by the descendants of Chaghatta or the Zamme Ke family.
There is also a madrasa near Adda Sheikhan named Jamia Imamul Asr, which is affiliated with Jamia Imam Khomeini Mari Indus. On the other hand, Sunni boys and girls get their religious education in their respective madrasas situated in the vicinity of mosques. 
The Shia Sunni brotherhood can be seen on the occasion of Ashura every year, when Shi'a Muslims have processions while Sunni Muslims make arrangements of Sabeel for them.
The annual procession on the tenth of Muharram goes through Thatta Shah Jamal, adjoining hamlets and Adda Sheikhan to Sheikhan.

 Production 
The area is agrarian, so village production is agriculturally based.

Wheat
Wheat, which is the primary part of the local diet, is a major crop in the area.

Rice
Local people do not eat much rice. There is a proverb in the local language: , meaning 'pasta is digested in between reaching up to the door and rice is digested maximum until midnight.' Nonetheless, rice is a major crop of the area.

Cotton
Cotton is grown in the village but can only fulfill the needs of the village's residents.

Barley
Barley is grown along with wheat and is cut a month before the wheat. It is used to get sattu by crushing its grain. Sattu is used for drinking mixed in water.

Vegetables
Vegetables grown in the area include cauliflower, turnip, cabbage, and lady finger.

Oranges
Oranges, called  in the local language, are the primary fruit in the area. They grow in the winter season, starting from October and lasting until April.

Sugar cane
Sugar cane, locally called , is also produced here. It is supplied to sugar mills and is also used in producing , that is, pieces of brown sugar.

Melons
Watermelon is also a major area product because there is plenty of underground water in the Hithar area at the banks of the river. It is a deep-ribbed melon.

Other fruit

Grasses

Milk and dairy products
As it is an agricultural area, most people keep cows and buffaloes. The milk is collected by various milk-reprocessing companies like Nestle, Chaudhry Dairies Limited, and Mubarak Dairies. Animal fat that is extracted from the cream in milk is called  in the local language and is internally traded. It was the primary part of daily diets in the past and now has been replaced by various hydrogenated fats. Another milk product, a yoghurt, extracted and condensed, is prepared at home. Butter is also traded internally.

 Business places 
Adda Sheikhan has become a business hub of the area. A branch of Habib Bank is situated at Adda Sheikhan. Crops, urea and other goods are traded here and people of the surrounding villages prefer to do their shopping at Adda Sheikhan. A telephone exchange also fulfills the communication needs of the entire area since 2005.

Communications

Mobile phone operators

 Mobilink GSM Pakistan
 Ufone GSM Pakistan
 Telenor GSM Pakistan
 Paktel GSM Pakistan

Telephone exchange
A landline telephone exchange was set up here by Pakistan Telecommunication Corporation Ltd.
Syed Shabar Abbas is head of this exchange.

 Telephone area code 
The area code for landline numbers is 0477 which applies to the entire district of Jhang. Most area numbers start with 6600xx and 6601xx, a total of seven numbers.

 World Wide Web 
Internet connectivity is available through dial-up connections.

 Transport 

 Road 
A link road between Lalian and Jhang City passes through Sheikhan. The main methods of travel on the road are vans and buses. The bus system has a long route from Jhang to Lalian, but vans start their route from Sheikhan to Jhang and vice versa.

 Air 
If one intends to come here by air, one must pick a flight to Faisalabad where one can hire a car to reach Jhang city and then into Sheikhan. Or one can avail a public transport that is van or bus from Faisalabad to Jhang and then again have to pick a van or auto bus from Jhang Lari Adda'' (Bus Terminal) to Sheikhan.

 Pakistan International Airlines – two daily flights to Faisalabad
 Airblue – one daily flight to Faisalabad

Rail 
The location can be reached by Shorkot-Shaheenabad (Multan-Sargodha Mainline) branch line. About eight trains run on the track daily.

Punjab, History
Populated places in Chiniot District
Chiniot District